Illinois Route 17 (IL 17) is a rural, arterial east–west state highway that runs east from a former ferry crossing in New Boston along the banks of the Mississippi River to State Road 2 west of Lowell, Indiana.

Route description 

Illinois 17 is the main street for numerous small towns in west central and central Illinois. It crosses the Illinois River at Lacon, and passes through Dwight and Kankakee, before it joins with Illinois Route 1 and enters Indiana east of Grant Park.

Illinois 17 also overlaps with U.S. Route 34, Illinois Route 251 (old U.S. Route 51), and Illinois Route 40 south of Wyoming. It also crosses the Kankakee River at Kankakee, IL. The route is largely a 2 lane road except through towns, where it occasionally becomes a 2 lane road with a center turn lane. East of Kankakee, Illinois 17 becomes a 4-lane divided highway.

At its western terminus, Illinois 17 is one of the only routes in the state not to connect to a state highway or U.S. Route of another state. A ferry crossing to Iowa had been dropped in the 1950s, but the terminus has not been moved east to reflect this. In 2003, the discovery that the Mississippi River had deepened at a nearby location raised the possibility of returning ferry service to New Boston. Ferry service in New Boston would be expected to bring 15,000 cars across the river yearly, saving the vehicles from driving to either Burlington, Iowa or Muscatine, Iowa — distances of about 50 miles (80 km) — to cross over into Iowa.

History 
SBI Route 17 originally ran from Lacon to Grant Park. The only changes to Route 17 have been extensions east and west, and a relocation to a new road south of Streator.

Illinois Route 83A connected Illinois Route 83 (now Illinois Route 17) to Keithsburg.

Major intersections

See also

References

External links

017
Transportation in Mercer County, Illinois
Transportation in Henry County, Illinois
Transportation in Knox County, Illinois
Transportation in Stark County, Illinois
Transportation in Marshall County, Illinois
Transportation in LaSalle County, Illinois
Transportation in Livingston County, Illinois
Transportation in Kankakee County, Illinois